The Malaysian National Computer Confederation (MNCC) is an association for information and communications technology professionals. Its stated aims are "dedicated to the development of IT Professionals and the creation of an Information Rich Society".

The MNCC was formed in 1967, then known as the Malaysian Computer Society. It was renamed to the MNCC, in 1988, when the association was registered under the Companies Act.

Activities 
Notable activities include: operation of the various special interest groups (SIGs), annual conferences, seminars, as well as IT scholarships.

Members are required to comply with the code of professional conduct and practice .

Special Interest Groups 
Special Interest Groups (SIGs) of the MNCC include wide and varied interests such as: the Open Document Format (ODFSIG), Open Source (OSSIG), Artificial Intelligence in Industry (AI3SIG), IP Telephony, Project Management and Storage.

Digital Library 
The MNCC Transactions on ICT contains free journal articles and conference papers.

Related organisations 
British Computer Society
Australian Computer Society
 Singapore Computer Society

External links 
Malaysian National Computer Confederation website

Professional associations based in Malaysia
Information technology organizations based in Asia
Organizations established in 1967
Science and technology in Malaysia
Scientific organisations based in Malaysia